Louisiana's 3rd congressional district is a United States congressional district in the U.S. state of Louisiana. The district covers the southwestern and south central portion of the state, ranging from the Texas border to the Atchafalaya River.

The district is currently represented by Republican Clay Higgins, a former sheriff's deputy from Port Barre known for his controversial Crime Stoppers videos. He was first elected to the United States House of Representatives in the December 10, 2016 runoff against public service commissioner Scott Angelle to replace Charles Boustany.

History
Louisiana gained its 2nd and 3rd congressional districts in 1823 as part of the 18th United States Congress. Since at least the 1870s, the district has been strongly influenced by southern Louisiana's Acadian culture.

Although the 3rd congressional district had been Democratic through much of its history, it is the sole district in Louisiana to have been represented by three parties during the 20th century, in that Whitmell P. Martin represented the district as a "Bull Moose" Progressive from 1915 to 1919, when he switched to the Democratic Party. Since the turn of the 20th century, it had dominated Louisiana as a one-party state after the legislature passed a new constitution that effectively disenfranchised African Americans through the 1960s. Martin remained in office as a Democrat until his death in 1929. 

The district became more competitive for the Republicans later in the 20th century, when conservative whites shifted into the Republican Party after passage of civil rights legislation by Congress. In 1966, Hall Lyons of Lafayette, polled 40 percent of the vote as a Republican candidate against veteran Democratic incumbent Edwin E. Willis. In 1972, the district elected David C. Treen as the first Republican U.S. representative from Louisiana since 1891.

The state legislature redistricted in the 1980s, pushing the district out of the fast-growing suburbs of Metairie and the city of Kenner, to help keep the seat in the hands of Treen's Democratic successor, Billy Tauzin. Tauzin eventually switched to the Republican Party in 1995, making the 3rd congressional district unique in 20th-century Louisiana politics as the sole district to have two representatives who switched parties (Martin, who switched from the Progressives to the Democrats in 1918, and Tauzin, who switched from the Democrats to the Republicans in 1995). As a Republican, Tauzin continued to serve until retiring from Congress in 2005. Democrat Charlie Melançon won the seat in 2004 (seated in 2005), was reelected in 2006, and was unopposed in 2008.

For most of the time from 1823 to 2013, the district contained large portions of southeastern and south central Louisiana, including the River Parishes and East Acadiana, In its final configuration, it included many exurban and rural areas near New Orleans, Baton Rouge and Lafayette. It contained the cities of Chalmette, Gonzales, Houma, Thibodaux, Morgan City, and New Iberia. 

However, when Louisiana lost a district after the 2010 census, the old 3rd was dismantled. The new 3rd included most of southwestern Louisiana, including Lafayette and Lake Charles. Most of this territory had been the 7th district before the 2010 census.  The old 3rd's last congressman, freshman Republican Jeff Landry, had his home in New Iberia, along with much of the western portion of his district, drawn into the new 3rd. He opted to challenge the 7th district's four-term incumbent, fellow Republican Charles Boustany, in the GOP primary.  However, Landry could not overcome the fact that he was running in a district in which more than 60 percent of his constituents were new to him. He lost to Boustany in the primary, ending his brief congressional career. The new 3rd, like both the old 3rd and 7th, has a rich Cajun culture.

Recent presidential elections

List of members representing the district

Recent election results

2002

2004

2006

2008

2010

2012

2014

2016

2018

2020

2022

See also

 Louisiana's congressional districts
 List of United States congressional districts

References

Sources
 
 
 Congressional Biographical Directory of the United States 1774–present, bioguide.congress.gov; accessed November 18, 2016.

External links
 Rep. Clay Higgins's official House of Representatives website

03